A list of skateparks in New York City.

List of parks by borough

The Bronx
Bronx Skate Park (Allerton Skatepark)
Bruckner Skate Park (a.k.a. Throggs Neck)
Rev. T. Wendell Foster Skate Park
Playground 52 LII
River Avenue Skate Park
 Van Cortlandt Skate Park
 Williamsbridge Oval Skate Park

Brooklyn

 Betsy Head Skatepark
Brower Park Skate Park
 Canarsie Park Skatepark
City Line Park
Cooper Park Skatepark
Golconda Skatepark (a.k.a. Fat Kid)
Martinez Playground Skate Park (a.k.a. Blue Park & Blue floor)
McCarren Park Skatepark
 Millennium Skate Park a.k.a. Owl's Head Skate Park
 Robert Venable Skate Park
Rudd Skate Park
St. Mary's Playground
 Seba Playground Skate Park
Sgt. William Dougherty Skate Park
Substance Skatepark
Thomas Greene Park Skate Park
Vans Skate Space 198
Washington Park Skate Park (a.k.a. MS 51)

Manhattan
 LES Skatepark
 Pier 62 Skatepark 
 Highbridge Skatepark
Andy Kessler Skatepark formerly Riverside Skatepark
 Thomas Jefferson Park Skate Park
 Tompkins Square Park
 TriBeCa Skatepark
 Open Road Skate Park (Summer only)

Queens
 Astoria Skate Plaza
 Far Rockaway Skate Park
 Flushing Meadows Corona Skate Park
 Forest Park Skate Park
 London Planetree Skate Park and Playground
 Rockaway Skate Park
Far Rockaway Skate Park

Staten Island
 5050 Skatepark
 Ben Soto Skate Park
 Faber Skate Park

References 

 

Parks in New York City